Manuel Moral da Veiga (16 March 1865 - 7 November 1913) was a Portuguese photographer and publisher active in early twentieth-century Peru.<ref>John Vavasour Noel (1913), Peru to-day, Volume 5, West Coast Publishing Co., 1913. p1063</ref> He was involved in the publication of Variedades (a weekly launched 10 March 1908) and previously Prisma (1905 - June 1907), and later La Crónica''.

Notes 

1913 deaths
Portuguese photographers
Portuguese publishers (people)
1865 births